Farm to Market Road 102 (FM 102) is a state highway in the U.S. state of Texas. The highway begins at State Highway 60 (SH 60) in Wharton in Wharton County. It heads northwest through Eagle Lake in Colorado County and ends at Interstate 10 (I-10) near Alleyton, which is just east of Columbus in Colorado County.

Route description
FM 102 begins at a three-way traffic signal on SH 60 and Future Business Interstate 69/Business U.S. Route 59 in Wharton. There is a Jack in the Box restaurant nearby. FM 102, which is also called Ogden Street, heads west-northwest for  before coming to the Future I-69/US 59 overpass. Future I-69/US 59 can be accessed in both directions via entrance ramps from the frontage road. An additional  brings the traveler to Glen Flora and its junction with FM 960. As it leaves Glen Flora, FM 102 turns to the northwest. After briefly swerving to the north near Bonus, FM 102 turns back to the northwest for  before intersecting with FM 3013. At the junction, FM 102 splits off to the left while FM 3013 bears to the right and takes a parallel route to Eagle Lake.

FM 102 leaves Wharton County shortly after passing FM 3013 and goes  before arriving at the intersection with FM 950 near Matthews. In the last part of this stretch, FM 102 is called Lakeside Drive and the lake is to the west. When US 90 forks to the left, FM 102 goes straight on Main Street into downtown Eagle Lake. At McCarty Avenue in front of the municipal building, the highway turns right for one block and crosses the Union Pacific Railroad before turning left on West Post Office Street. Within a few blocks, FM 102 leaves Eagle Lake behind as it heads northwest alongside the railroad tracks. Near Ramsey, the highway curves to the right, away from the railroad, and enters an area that is hilly and forested. In the last mile of FM 102, the highway passes the small community of Alleyton. Traffic can access I-10 east and west by using entrance ramps from the frontage road.

History
FM 102 was originally designated on May 18, 1944, to begin in Wharton and proceed northwest to Egypt. On June 13, 1945, a second section of the highway was started at US 90A in Eagle Lake and ran south to the Wharton County line. On July 9, 1945 the two separate sections were linked when a new section between Egypt and the Wharton-Colorado county line was added. At this time, FM 102 ran continuously from Wharton to Eagle Lake. This route ran over the old US 90A right-of-way. On May 22, 1958, a  portion of the former US 90A right-of-way in Eagle Lake was transferred to FM 102. Of this distance,  was a spur route. A  spur was added near Alleyton on June 28, 1963. A  section of FM 102 near Alleyton was canceled on October 28, 1966 and the former Alleyton spur became the main route. On June 30, 1976, FM 102 was designated as starting at Loop 183 in Wharton instead of at the old US 59, since what is now I-69/US 59 was moved to a new location. Loop 183 was redesignated as Bus. I-69/Bus. US 59 on October 29, 1998.

Major intersections

See also

References

0102
Transportation in Colorado County, Texas
Transportation in Wharton County, Texas
U.S. Route 90